Banksia Hall is a private residence located in Barnwell, South Carolina. It is noteworthy because it is representative of the state's upcountry style of plantation home, circa 1780–1800. The landmark is historically significant as well. Shortly after the Civil War, federal military forces used the house to grant pardon to those who participated in the war, provided they pledged allegiance to the Union and promised to obey the laws of the United States. Banskia Hall was listed in the National Register of Historic Places on May 31, 1974.

References

Houses on the National Register of Historic Places in South Carolina
Georgian architecture in South Carolina
Houses completed in 1795
Houses in Barnwell County, South Carolina
National Register of Historic Places in Barnwell County, South Carolina